Gibberula farlensis is a species of very small sea snail, a marine gastropod mollusk or micromollusk in the family Cystiscidae.

Description
The length of the shell attains 2.26 mm.

Distribution
This marine species occurs in the Caribbean Sea off Belize.

References

farlensis
Cystiscidae
Gastropods described in 2009